Francis Anthony "Bud" Toscani (April 19, 1909 – June 21, 1966) was an American football player.  A native of California, Toscani attended Santa Rosa High School in Santa Rosa, California, and Saint Mary's College of California in Moraga, California. While attending Saint Mary's, he played college football for the Saint Mary's Gaels football team. He scored the game-winning touchdown against USC in 1931, running 55 yards after catching a pass. He was selected by the Newspaper Enterprise Association (NEA) as a second-team halfback on the 1931 College Football All-America Team.  He also played professional football in the National Football League in 1932 for the Chicago Cardinals and the Brooklyn Dodgers. He appeared in four games for the Dodgers and three for the Cardinals.

He was married in 1933 to Leonore Slusser. He died in 1966 in Reno, Nevada.

References

1909 births
1966 deaths
American football halfbacks
Brooklyn Dodgers (NFL) players
Chicago Cardinals players
Saint Mary's Gaels football players
Sportspeople from Santa Rosa, California
Players of American football from California